Spruce Grove Township is the name of some places in the U.S. state of Minnesota:
Spruce Grove Township, Becker County, Minnesota
Spruce Grove Township, Beltrami County, Minnesota

Minnesota township disambiguation pages